The Hierta family (lit. "Heart";), also Hjerta and Järta is a Swedish-Finnish-Russian noble family – uradel – of Swedish origin. The Finnish branch of the Hierta family was naturalized as a Finnish noble family, in what was then the Grand Duchy of Finland, at the Finnish house of nobility in 1818.

Notable members 

 Lars Johan Hierta (1801–1872), Newspaper publisher
 Anna Hierta-Retzius (1841–1924), Women's rights activist and philanthropist
 Hans Hierta (1774–1847), Swedish administrator and revolutionary

References 

Hierta family
Swedish noble families
Russian noble families
Finnish noble families